Kene is a given name and surname of various origins. Notable people with this name include:

Kene Eze (born 1992), American soccer player
Kene Holliday (born 1949), American actor 
Kéné Ndoye (born 1978), Senegalese athlete
Kene Nwangwu (born 1998), American football player
Arinze Kene, British actor and playwright
John Kene ( 1402), British politician

See also 
Kene (Naga wrestling)
Keene (surname)
Keen (surname)